Notre-Dame de Clignancourt (Our Lady of Clignancourt) is a Roman Catholic church located in the 18th arrondissement of Paris. Completed in 1863, the church takes its name from Clignancourt, a small village in the commune of Montmartre that was annexed to Paris in 1860. It was one of three new parishes created to accommodate the growing population in the northern edge of the city. 

The cornerstone was laid by the French city planner Georges-Eugène Haussmann in 1859. It was designed in the  Neo-Romanesque style by Paul-Eugène Lequeux and completed in 1863. Many valuable pieces of furniture and religious objects were donated by Empress Eugenie, the wife of Napoleon III, but were lost or damaged when the church was pillaged in the violence leading up to the Paris Commune in 1870. 

The church still contains paintings and frescos by prominent 19th-century artists, including Romain Cazes and Félix-Joseph Barrias, and a large marble sculpture depicting the Pietà. The stained glass windows in the lower part of the church are largely from the Art Deco period. The windows in the choir, depicting the Holy Trinity and the Litany of Loreto, were made by Jacques Le Chevallier in the 1970s. 

The organ in Notre-Dame de Clignancourt was built by Joseph Merklin. Several prominent musicians are associated with the church. Gabriel Fauré and Victor Sieg both served as organists there. Louis Vierne played the organ for the funeral of the French violinist Henri Adam held at the church in 1890, and the composer André Jolivet attended the church's choir school in his youth.

References

External links
 Official website 
Notre-Dame de Clignancourt on Patrimoine-Histoire 

Roman Catholic churches in the 18th arrondissement of Paris
Romanesque Revival church buildings in France
Roman Catholic churches completed in 1863
19th-century Roman Catholic church buildings in France